James William Locke (October 30, 1837 – September 5, 1922) was a United States district judge of the United States District Court for the Southern District of Florida.

Education and career
 
Born in Wilmington, Vermont in 1837, Locke read law to enter the bar in 1859. Locke served as Paymaster's Clerk in the United States Navy from 1861 to 1865, during the American Civil War. He was in private practice in Key West, Florida from 1865 to 1872. Locke served as county superintendent of education for Monroe County and as a clerk and later commissioner of the United States District Court for the Southern District of Florida. Locke served as a Judge of the Monroe County Court from 1868 to 1870, and as a member of the Florida Senate from 1870 to 1872.

Federal judicial service

President Ulysses S. Grant nominated Locke to the United States District Court for the Southern District of Florida on January 15, 1872, to the seat vacated by Judge John McKinney. Confirmed by the United States Senate on February 1, 1872, he received commission on February 1, 1872. Locke ended service on July 4, 1912, retiring after over 40 years on the bench. He was President Grant's longest-serving judicial appointee, and the longest to have served as a federal judge in Florida. Locke died on September 5, 1922 in Kittery, Maine.

References

Sources
 

1837 births
1922 deaths
People from Wilmington, Vermont
Florida state senators
Judges of the United States District Court for the Southern District of Florida
United States federal judges appointed by Ulysses S. Grant
19th-century American judges
United States federal judges admitted to the practice of law by reading law